An elastic bandage  is a "stretchable bandage used to create localized pressure". Elastic bandages are commonly used to treat muscle sprains and strains by reducing the flow of blood to a particular area by the application of even stable pressure which can restrict swelling at the place of injury. Elastic bandages are also used to treat bone fractures. Padding is applied to the fractured limb, then a splint (usually plaster) is applied. The elastic bandage is then applied to hold the splint in place and to protect it. This is a common technique for fractures which may swell, which would cause a cast to function improperly. These types of splints are usually removed after swelling has decreased and then a fiberglass or plaster cast can be applied.

Due to the risk of latex allergies among users, the original composition of elastic bandages has changed. While some bandages are still manufactured with latex, many woven and knitted elastic bandages provide adequate compression without the use of natural rubber or latex. The modern elastic bandage is constructed from cotton, polyester and latex-free elastic yarns. By varying the ratio of cotton, polyester, and the elastic yarns within a bandage, manufacturers are able to offer various grades of compression and durability in their wraps. Often aluminum or stretchable clips are used to fasten the bandage in place once it has been wrapped around the injury. Some elastic bandages even use Velcro closures to secure and stabilize the wrap in place.

Aside from use in sports medicine and by orthopedists, elastic bandages are popular in the treatment of lymphedema and other venous conditions.  However, some compression wraps are inadequate for the treatment of lymphedema or chronic venous insuffiency.  They provide a high resting compression and low active compression.  A more appropriate use for compression in treating lymphedema or other edema conditions would be TG shapes, tensoshapes, compression socks or compression wraps for acute conditions or exacerbation.  Physical therapists and occupational therapists have special training and certifications to apply appropriate compression wraps for edema and lymphedema.  Elastic bandages can also be used for weight loss when applied as a body wrap and rehabilitating injured animals through veterinary medicine.

Elastic bandages should not be confused with compression therapy devices designed for the purpose of venous edema management or lymphedema management.  Such devices are specifically designed to deliver graduated compression from the ankle to the knee, to assist with venous return.

See also

 Elastic therapeutic tape
 Self-adhering bandage
 Cohesive bandage
 Buddy wrapping
 Athletic taping

References

First aid